Bronx Fire may refer to:

 2022 Bronx apartment fire
 2017 Bronx apartment fire
 Happy Land fire